The PayPal Wars: Battles with eBay, the Media, the Mafia, and the Rest of Planet Earth (2004) is a book by former PayPal marketing executive Eric M. Jackson.

Description
The PayPal Wars is an insider's perspective on the people and events that helped create the company, and its acquisition by eBay in 2002. The book recounts PayPal's clashes with lawyers, regulators, and the Mafia. Many of PayPal's founding employees went on to start other companies like LinkedIn, Tesla Motors, YouTube, and Yelp, Inc.; they would become known as the PayPal Mafia.

Critical reception
The PayPal Wars received acclaim for its writing style and personal narrative. The Washington Times said the book is "an absorbing insider's story." Reason Magazine said that it "reads like a spy novel."  Tech Central Station said that "It's rare that a business book is a page turner, but The PayPal Wars is." Tom Peters said The PayPal Wars "gives the best description of 'business strategy' unfolding in a world changing at warp speed."

Editions
The PayPal Wars: Battles with eBay, the Media, the Mafia, and the Rest of Planet Earth, World Ahead Publishing,

References

PayPal
2004 non-fiction books
Books about computer and internet companies
Information economy